Whittle may refer to:

Crafts
Whittling, the carving of wood with a knife

People
Whittle (name), a surname, and a list of people with the name

Places
Whittle, Kentucky
Whittle, Derbyshire, a hamlet near Glossop, Derbyshire, United Kingdom
Whittle-le-Woods, a village in Lancashire

Companies
Whittle Shortline US toy company
Whittles, a bus company in England

TV shows
 Whittle (game show) short-lived UK gameshow from 1997

Aviation
Gloster Whittle the first British jet aircraft
Whittle Unit jet engine
Whittle W1 jet engine
Whittle W2 jet engine

See also
 Justice Whittle (disambiguation)